Mount Kitanglad is an inactive volcano located in the Kitanglad Mountain Range in Bukidnon province on Mindanao island. It is located between Malaybalay City and the municipalities of Lantapan, Impasugong, Sumilao, and Libona. It is home to one of the Philippines' few remaining rainforests.

The name "Kitanglad" was derived from a legend that there was once a great flood that submerged the native lands of Bukidnon and only the tip of the mountain, the size of a "tanglad" (lemon grass), remained visible ("kita" in Visayan). It is considered as an ancestral domain of several old cultural communities like the Bukidnons, Higaonons and Talaandigs.

Mount Kitanglad was proclaimed a protected area under the natural park category through Presidential Proclamation 896 dated October 24, 1996. On November 9, 2000, Mount Kitanglad finally became a full-fledged protected area when Congress approved Republic Act 8978 also known as the "Mt. Kitanglad Range Protected Area Act of 2000."

In 2009, Mount Kitanglad Range Natural Park (MKRNP) was declared as an ASEAN Heritage Park.

Mount Kitanglad is recognized for its cultural and biological diversity. It is part of the ancestral domain of three major indigenous groups: the Talaandig, Higaonon, and Bukidnon peoples.

Mount Kitanglad hosts over 600 rare and endemic species, including the Philippine tarsier and the Rafflesia schadenbergiana, the world's second largest flower. It is a nesting place for the critically endangered Philippine eagle. Other endemic species that are found here are the pygmy fruit bat Alionycteris paucidentata and two native mice, Crunomys suncoides and Limonmys bryophilus.

Indigenous communities are working to have Mount Kitanglad recognized as indigenous peoples' and community conserved territories and areas to enforce indigenous customary rules on the mountain range.

See also
 Mount Kalatungan
 List of Southeast Asian mountains
 List of inactive volcanoes in the Philippines

Notes

References

Further reading

External links

 Pinoy Mountaineer
 Mount Kitanglad on Mountain-Forecast

Kitanglad
Kitanglad
Landforms of Bukidnon
Inactive volcanoes of the Philippines